is a fictional character created by Kazuhiko Kato aka Monkey Punch as the protagonist for his manga series Lupin III, which debuted in Weekly Manga Action on August 10, 1967. According to his creator, Lupin is the grandson of Maurice Leblanc's gentleman thief Arsène Lupin.

Acknowledged across the globe as the world's number one thief, Lupin is a master of disguise and deduction, marksmanship, and inventor of numerous handy gadgets. His fun-loving, foolhardy incongruity covers a brilliant mind always extemporizing and re-evaluating. As such, he has been responsible for heists no right-minded individual would believe possible. While occasionally arrested and jailed, typically by his ICPO nemesis Inspector Koichi Zenigata, he always succeeds in escaping unharmed. The original manga differs significantly compared to the family-friendly anime incarnations through its explicit depictions of sex and violence, with Lupin's character also differing as a result. For example, he and his famous gang, beautiful Fujiko Mine, cool triggerman Daisuke Jigen and incomparable samurai Goemon Ishikawa XIII, occasionally try to kill each other in the manga version, but are nonetheless an inseparable team in various anime productions.

Creation
The aim of Lupin III was to produce a comedy adventure series that reflected the traits of Leblanc's Arsène Lupin character. Originally, the intention was to keep the blood ties between the two fictional characters secret. However, Monkey Punch was convinced by others not to do so. He combined elements of Arsène Lupin with James Bond to develop the character of Lupin III and made him a "carefree fellow".

In the original manga, Lupin and his team typically work individually for their own goals. Monkey Punch explained it is only in the anime that they frequently operate together, suspecting some unwritten rule that all five main characters have to appear in every episode. He believed that Lupin and Fujiko were similar to the characters of D'Artagnan and Milady de Winter, and described them as "Not necessarily lovers, not necessarily husband and wife, but more just having fun as man and woman with each other". Inspector Zenigata was conceived as Lupin's archrival to create a "human Tom and Jerry". Monkey Punch said the appeal of drawing Lupin came from the character being able to go anywhere without obstacles and being able to do whatever he wants, whenever he wants. However, this is contrasted by the appeal of Zenigata's strict personality. Monkey Punch said that he believed the Lupin III story could never end but that if he had to, both Zenigata and Lupin would end up as equals. They would either both fail, both win or both get very old.

In typical anime style, Lupin's appearance is racially ambiguous and tends to oblique his origins. He has black hair plastered flat with what is either a widow's peak or a V-shaped bang. His trademark sideburns extend from ear to nearly the chin. Outside his preference for large and rather plain boots, Lupin is a sharp dresser. He typically wears a button-down shirt, tie, chinos and a brightly colored sports jacket—exclusively red in the manga, while in animation his jackets are various colors which color-code his TV series (green for Part I and Part 6, a few OVAs and The Woman Called Fujiko Mine; red for Part II and most films and television specials; pink for Part III; blue for Part IV and Part V). In some images, Lupin is depicted as being cross-eyed; however, this may be a comic flourish by the artist(s) rather than a physical characteristic.

Personality
In Monkey Punch's original manga, Lupin is cocky, quite crude, and for the most part remorseless. He is very much the ladies' man, often using them for his own gains, and is not beyond forcing himself upon women who resist his advances. Mike Toole of Anime News Network referred to the character as a "rough, drunken, lecherous crook." This is in stark contrast to his better-known anime self, who although a skilled thief, occasionally comes off as a chivalrous goofball who enjoys helping those less fortunate than he.  Furthermore, Lupin often takes it upon himself and his gang to stop criminals engaged in more violent crimes and leave them for Zenigata to arrest. In the anime, while he fancies himself a Casanova, his actual success with women is erratic, appearing to fluctuate with the writer.

Even though his gang's loyalty has been an issue, with Fujiko willing to betray and cohort Goemon promising to eventually kill him, Lupin will still drop everything to come to their aid in a helpless moment; further the team would rather face torture than to betray Lupin (or he betray them) to a third party. This rule of loyalty curiously extends as well to Inspector Zenigata, whom Lupin considers a respected friend and opposition.  The Inspector reciprocates this regard and out of gratitude has vowed never to attempt to kill Lupin. Lupin's vendetta against the Tarantula Gang in In Memory of the Walther P-38 was partly settling of past betrayal and mostly vengeful payback for their shooting and nearly killing Zenigata.

It seems Lupin loves to steal more than actually having the treasure he sought. Lupin relishes more in the challenge of stealing and, as long as he succeeds in the heist, is usually not that upset when he ends up empty-handed; there have been times he has lost the object or intentionally thrown it away. There have also been times when Lupin stole an object only to give it to someone else, such as if it rightfully belonged to them or they needed it more than he did.

When not involved in criminal activities, Lupin usually spends his time dating beautiful girls, fishing, race car driving, attending formal dinners, playing pool, casino gambling, and participating in café society.  His favorite foods seem to be mostly French cuisine, sushi, and seafood; when on a job he may settle with ramen noodles.  In Lupin the Third Part V, he is shown with an affection for galettes. He also smokes cigarettes and occasionally cigars and kreteks; in the manga, he's seen smoking a briar pipe. His preferred cigarette is the famous French brand Gitanes. Lupin is a celebrated race car driver, competing in several international events when time allows. He's also a skilled sleight of hand artist who loves to befuddle his opponents with various gimmicks: i.e., a cigarette which explodes into confetti, a gun with a spring-loaded boxing glove that clobbers the shooter, and bubble gum that becomes plastique after brief chewing.

Skills

Physically, Lupin is a man of average strength, but he can throw a surprisingly good punch. He is incredibly flexible and fast, and his manual dexterity is cat-like in precision and quickness. His talent in the art of disguise borders on the superhuman, with him able to flawlessly impersonate any man or woman in face, voice and costume after minimal observation. This skill is so complete that he can even fool close friends and family members of the subject.  His skinny body enables him to easily impersonate larger individuals by use of oversized outfits, with attack paraphernalia usually making up the disguise's bulk.  His favorite disguise has always been that of Inspector Zenigata, which incenses his adversary to no end.  Lupin possesses an encyclopedic knowledge of various topics, such as history, the different sciences, fluency in multiple languages, etc.  He shows amazing intuition and quick awareness of his surroundings.

Lupin favors the long outdated Walther P38 as his principal firearm. He is shown to be an excellent marksman, having on at least one occasion fired directly into the barrel of another gun, although not quite on a par with Jigen.

Despite the criminal nature of his activities, Lupin has a strict code that he follows in order to not taint his reputation. Lupin dislikes killing and takes care to use non lethal means to achieve his goals.  When Lupin believes he has an illness causing him to become a compulsive killer he asks Jigen to kill him to save the lives of any potential victims.  While killing is against his nature, he is willing to fire upon any enemy who threatens his friends or allies.

Lupin is a talented driver, motorcyclist and pilot. His favorite automobiles seem to be either the Mercedes-Benz SSK or a souped up 1965 Fiat 500 F, most famously seen in Castle of Cagliostro. Also worth mentioning is the Alfa Romeo 6C 1750. In the case of the SSK, one of the rarest cars in the world, one problem or another seems to cause the car's destruction in virtually every episode it's featured.  Lupin either has several SSK models in possession, owns a selection of counterfeit models, or is talented to the extreme at auto repair and reconstruction.

Lupin is a formidable escape artist, capable of cracking any safe or escaping from shackles in moments. He can even use his restraints to entrap his would-be captor before making his departure.  Seemingly prepared for all contingencies, he can break free of confinement even when surrounded.

In spite of his facade of reckless childlike antics, i.e., taunts, silly faces, and leaving notes of his next caper, Lupin's brilliance for tactics and originality belies any underestimations his behavior may have implied. In the Lupin III vs Detective Conan special, not only did he figure out Conan was far more intelligent than he appeared, but had also discerned his identity as Shinichi Kudo.

Origins

Lupin's ethnic origins have been specified in the second anime series (2nd TV series, episode 118) as well as being mentioned in the manga as half Japanese and half French.  In the 2008 OVA Green Vs. Red, a dossier held by Zenigata indicates his place of birth as "unknown". However more evidence exists of his French background while his race appears Asian.  While recent productions have begun to cast doubt as to his relation to the original Arsene Lupin, the manga and virtually all the anime make it clear that he is indeed the grandson of LeBlanc's original hero.

In the first TV series, episode 13 ("Beware the Time Machine!"), Lupin tricks Mamo Kyosuke by dressing as a Japanese peasant and acting as though they are in feudal Japan. Lupin specifically states to Mamo that the ancestor whose face he most resembles was Japanese. When Mamo "meets" this ancestor (Lupin in disguise), Lupin states that he would like to marry some girl by the name of Mylene Lupin from France someday. This indicates that Arsene Lupin himself, LeBlanc's hero, is a quarter Japanese.

Lupin often speaks of both his famous grandfather and his father, both of whom were thieves. He occasionally quotes his grandfather's advice and has attempted to complete or repeat heists attempted by his ancestors with good or bad luck.

Voice actors
Arsène Lupin III was first voiced by Taichirō Hirokawa in the CinemaScope version of the 1969 pilot film for the first anime, while Nachi Nozawa voiced him in the pilot's TV version. However, Yasuo Yamada was given the role when the first anime was actually produced (1971–72) and continued to voice Lupin until his death in 1995, with one exception. Due to budget concerns, TMS decided not to employ the regular voice cast for the 1987 original video animation The Fuma Conspiracy, with Toshio Furukawa voicing Lupin. Kanichi Kurita took over the role after Yamada's death and he continues to voice Lupin III to this day. In the Lupin Zero prequel ONA series, Lupin is voiced by Tasuku Hatanaka.

Due to a lack of localization credits on any known prints, Lupin's English voice actor in the 1979 Toho/Frontier Enterprises dub of The Mystery of Mamo remained unverified until 2018, when a chance discovery by fans revealed the voice actor to be Tom Clark. From 1992 to 1995, Bob Bergen voiced Lupin in Streamline Pictures' dubs of The Castle of Cagliostro (in which the character was renamed "The Wolf" to avoid legal complications with Maurice Leblanc's estate), episodes 145 and 155 of the second anime (collectively released as Lupin III: Tales of the Wolf and later Lupin III's Greatest Capers) and The Mystery of Mamo. For AnimEigo's 1995 release of The Fuma Conspiracy, Lupin, named "Rupan" in the dub, was voiced by Robin Robertson. In Manga Entertainment's 1996 dubs of The Mystery of Mamo and Bye Bye, Lady Liberty (retitled Secret of Mamo and Goodbye Lady Liberty respectively) for the UK market, Bill Dufris provided Lupin's voice, where the character was renamed "Wolf III". In Manga's 2000 dub of The Castle of Cagliostro, produced in cooperation with Animaze, David Hayter provides Lupin's voice; due to the non-union nature of the project, Hayter was initially credited as "Sean Barker". Hayter was also involved in the production of Discotek Media's re-release of the film, and re-voiced several of his lines for a "family-friendly" edit of the Animaze/Manga dub produced exclusively for Discotek.

Sonny Strait voiced Lupin in Funimation Entertainment's dubs of several TV specials and theatrical films between 2002 and 2005, and in their 2013 dub of The Woman Called Fujiko Mine. Tony Oliver voiced Lupin in the Phuuz dub of the second anime and The Mystery of Mamo for Pioneer/Geneon, as well as the video game Treasure of the Sorcerer King, between 2003 and 2006. Oliver reprised the role for Discotek's dubs of the fifth and sixth anime. Keith Silverstein voiced the character in the Bang Zoom! Entertainment dub for Discotek's 2015 release of the Jigen's Gravestone film.

Appearances in other media
Lupin makes an appearance as a guest character in the 2012 game Girls RPG Cinderelife developed by Level-5 for the Nintendo 3DS.  The character has also been used in television advertising for motorcycles, gasoline, razors, fast food companies, etc.

Reception
Allen Divers of Anime News Network (ANN) called Lupin "one of the most recognized figures in Japan" with many homages and references in other series. Similarly, Crunchyroll's Kara Dennison said that even if someone has not seen a Lupin title, they have "almost certainly experienced something either inspired by or paying tribute to him and his gang." Lupin was voted the eighth most iconic anime hero by Mania.com. IGN ranked Lupin as the fifteenth best anime character of all time in 2009, placing him on the 16th spot in 2014.

After completing his involvement with the Lupin III franchise in 1980, Hayao Miyazaki wrote an article in Animage where he discussed his view of the series and the character. He stated that Lupin was "truly a character of his era" but that as the franchise progressed he had been overtaken by the real world. Despite this, Miyazaki still thought fondly of Lupin's early days. For the video game Persona 5, its creative team originally asked themselves how a character like Arsène Lupin III might win appeal in modern society.

Anime director and voice actor Shinichi Watanabe is known for dressing like Lupin in his daily life, a trait which is extended to his avatar character in Excel Saga, Nabeshin.

See also

Notes

References

Lupin the Third characters
Comics characters introduced in 1967
Fictional French people in television
Fictional French people in literature
Fictional gentleman thieves
Fictional Japanese people in anime and manga
Male characters in anime and manga
Vigilante characters in comics